Sibbesse is a village and a municipality in the district of Hildesheim, in Lower Saxony, Germany. It is situated approximately 10 km south of Hildesheim. Since 1 November 2016, the former municipalities Adenstedt, Almstedt, Eberholzen and Westfeld are part of the municipality Sibbesse.

Sibbesse was the seat of the former Samtgemeinde ("collective municipality") Sibbesse. The villages Möllensen, Hönze and Petze are also part of the municipality.

References 

Hildesheim (district)